Roger W. Teague is a retired United States Air Force major general who is the chief executive officer of PredaSAR. In the U.S. Air Force, he last served as the Director of Strategic Plans, Programs, and Analysis of the Air Force Space Command.

References

External links
 

Year of birth missing (living people)
Living people
Place of birth missing (living people)
United States Air Force generals